Planica 1950 was an International ski flying week with four competitions held from 12—19 March 1950 in Planica, PR Slovenia, FPR Yugoslavia. A total over 50,000 people has gathered in the whole week.

Schedule

Competitions
On 12 March 1950, International Ski Flying Week has officially started with trial round with the first of two International competitions on Srednja Bloudkova K80 normal hill this week. Thorleif Schjelderup won the competition with 79.5 and 77.5 metres.

On 13 March 1950, training with three to four rounds the International competition on Srednja Bloudkova K80 normal hill was on schedule in front of 3,000 people. Janez Polda was the longest with 82 metres.

On 14 March 1950, first training on Bloudkova velikanka K120 large hill was on schedule with the distance of the day at 89 metres by Rudi Finžgar. At 10:30 AM training was also held on K80 normal hill and Sverre Stenersen was the longest with 80 metres.

On 15 March 1950, first day of Ski Flying Study competition with three rounds on K120 was on schedule with the distance of the day at 107 metres by Janez Polda. Some of the Yugoslavian and Norwegian ski jumpers also trained at K80 hill.

On 16 March 1950, second day of Ski Flying Study competition with three rounds on K120 was on schedule with the distance of the day at 101 metres by Janez Polda. Ski jumpers were training also at K80 hill.

On 17 March 1950, third day of Ski Flying Study competition with two rounds on K120 was on schedule with the distance of the day at 114 metres by Janez Polda in front of 8,000 people. At the training at K80 hill, Janez Polda was the longest at 76 metres.

On 18 March 1950, only trainings on both normal and large hill were held on the request of Austrian and Norwegian ski jumpers.

On 19 March 1950, the final day of International Ski Flying week was on schedule with two competitions in front of 30,000 people. Exhibition event on Bloudkova velianka K120 large in two rounds was on schedule first and Rudi Finžgar won the event with 114 metres. Only 15 minutes after the end of exhibition, the whole crowd moved to the neighbour K80 normal hill where they finished with international competition and Sverre Stenersen won this event with 75.5 and 80.5 metres.

Normal hill

International competition 1
12 March 1950 — Two rounds — official results — chronological order incomplete

International competition 2
11 AM — 19 March 1950 — Two rounds — official results — chronological order incomplete

Large hill

Training
14 March 1950 — Four rounds — chronological order

Ski Flying Study: Day 1
Morning — 15 March 1950 — Three rounds — chronological order

Ski Flying Study: Day 2
16 March 1950 — Two rounds — chronological order

Ski Flying Study: Day 3
17 March 1950 — Two rounds — chronological order

Exhibition event
10 AM — 19 March 1950 — Two rounds — chronological order incomplete

 Fall or touch!

Official results

Ski Flying Study
15-17 March 1950 – the best jump

Exhibition
19 March 1950 – 10 AM – the best jump

References

1950 in Yugoslav sport
1950 in ski jumping
1950 in Slovenia
Ski jumping competitions in Yugoslavia
International sports competitions hosted by Yugoslavia
Ski jumping competitions in Slovenia
International sports competitions hosted by Slovenia